Lake Boomanjin is a large perched lake in the Fraser Coast Region of Queensland, Australia. The lake is located on Fraser Island (also known as K'gari and Gari) in the Great Sandy National Park.

Lake Boomanjin is considered the largest perched lake in the world, meaning that the lake floor is above the water table. It is one of 40 perched lakes on Fraser Island, all of which make up half of the known perched lakes in the world.

The lake is known for its reddish brown color, which is caused by colored dissolved organic matter including tannins from tea trees growing in its watershed. Its inflow comes from two small creeks that pass through wallum swamp, providing the sources of the dissolved matter that creates the unique color. Lake Boomanjin’s floor is covered in white quartz-rich sands.  Carnivorous plants, bladderworts, can be found near the lake. 

Compared to nearby lakes with clearer water, Lake Boomanjin gets less attention from tourism overall. There is a campsite on Lake Boomanjin managed as part of the K’gari Recreation Area within Great Sandy National Park.

Lake Boomanjin is a sacred location for the Butchulla People, the original inhabitants of the Fraser Coast Region.

See also 

Brown Lake (Stradbroke Island)
Colored dissolved organic matter
Lake McKenzie
Lake Wabby
List of lakes of Australia
Tannins

References 

Fraser Coast Region
Lakes of Queensland
Bodies of water of Queensland
Lakes of Australia